To the Happy Few is the fifth studio album by American rock band Medicine, released in August 2013 by the Captured Tracks label.

Track listing

References

2013 albums
Medicine (band) albums